Mechanical filters are a class of filter for air-purifying respirators that mechanically stops particulates from reaching the wearer's nose and mouth. They come in multiple physical forms.

Mechanism of operation 

Mechanical filter respirators retain particulate matter such as dust created during woodworking or metal processing, when contaminated air is passed through the filter material. Wool is still used today as a filter, along with plastic, glass, cellulose, and combinations of two or more of these materials. Since the filters cannot be cleaned and reused and have a limited lifespan, cost and disposability are key factors. Single-use, disposable and replaceable-cartridge models exist.

Mechanical filters remove contaminants from air in the following ways:

 by interception when particles following a line of flow in the airstream come within one radius of a fiber and adhere to it;
 by impaction, when larger particles unable to follow the curving contours of the airstream are forced to embed in one of the fibers directly; this increases with diminishing fiber separation and higher air flow velocity
 by an enhancing mechanism called diffusion, where gas molecules collide with the smallest particles, especially those below 100 nm in diameter, which are thereby impeded and delayed in their path through the filter; this effect is similar to Brownian motion and increases the probability that particles will be stopped by either of the two mechanisms above; it becomes dominant at lower air flow velocities
 by using electret filter material (usually, electrospun plastic fibers) to attract or repel particles with an electrostatic charge, so that they are more likely to collide with the filter surface
 by using certain coatings on the fibers that kill or deactivate infectious particles colliding with them (such as salt)
 by using gravity and allowing particles to settle into the filter material (this effect is typically negligible); and
 by using the particles themselves, after the filter has been used, to act as a filter medium for other particles.

Considering only particulates carried on an air stream and a fiber mesh filter, diffusion predominates below the 0.1 μm diameter particle size. Impaction and interception predominate above 0.4 μm. In between, near the most penetrating particle size of 0.3 μm, diffusion and interception predominate.

For maximum efficiency of particle removal and to decrease resistance to airflow through the filter, particulate filters are designed to keep the velocity of air flow through the filter as low as possible. This is achieved by manipulating the slope and shape of the filter to provide larger surface area.

High-efficiency particulate air (HEPA)filters are all filters meeting certain efficiency standards. A HEPA filter must remove at least 99.97% (US) or 99.95% (EU) of all airborne particulates with aerodynamic diameter of 0.3 μm. Particles both smaller and larger are easier to catch, and thus removed with a higher efficiency. People often assume that particles smaller than 0.3 microns would be more difficult to filter efficiently; however, the physics of Brownian motion at such smaller sizes boosts filter efficiency (see figure).

Materials
Mechanical filters can be made of a fine mesh of synthetic polymer fibers. The fibers are produced by melt blowing. The fibers are charged as they are blown to produce an electret, and then layered to form a nonwoven polypropylene fabric.

Exhalation valves

Some masks have check valves, that let the exhaled air go out unfiltered. The certification grade of the mask (as N95 or FFP2) is about the mask itself and it does not warrant any safety about the air that is expelled by the wearer through the valve. A mask with valve will reduce inwards leakages, thus improving the wearer protection.

Unfiltered-exhalation valves are sometimes found in both filtering facepiece and elastomeric respirators; PAPRs cannot by nature ever filter exhaled air. As a result, these masks are believed to be incapable of source control, which is protecting others against an infection in the wearer's breath. They are not generally designed for healthcare use, . Despite the aforementioned belief, a 2020 research by the NIOSH and CDC shows that an uncovered exhalation valve already provides source control on a level similar to, or even better than, surgical masks.

During the COVID-19 pandemic, masks with unfiltered-exhalation valves did not meet the requirements of some mandatory mask orders. It is possible to seal some unfiltered exhalation valves or to cover it with an additional surgical mask; this might be done where mask shortages make it necessary.

Uses

Filtering facepiece respirators 
Filtering facepiece respirator (FFPs) are disposable face masks produced from a whole piece of filtering material. FFPs (such as N95 masks) are discarded when they become unsuitable for further use due to considerations of hygiene, excessive resistance, or physical damage.

Mass production of filtering facepieces started in 1956. The air was purified with nonwoven filtering material consisting of polymeric fibers carrying a strong electrostatic charge. Respirator was used in nuclear industry, and then in other branches of economy. For ~60 years, more than 6 billion respirators were manufactured. Unfortunately, the developers overestimated the efficiency (APF 200-1000 compared to the modern value of 10–20), which led to serious errors in the choice of personal protective equipment by employers.

Elastomeric respirators

Elastomeric respirators are reusable devices with exchangeable cartridge filters that offer comparable protection to N95 masks. The filters must be replaced when soiled, contaminated, or clogged.

They may have exhalation valves. Full-face versions of elastomeric respirators seal better and protect the eyes. Fitting and inspection is essential to effectiveness.

Powered air-purifying respirators (PAPRs)

PAPRs are masks with an electricity-powered blower that blows air through a filter to the wearer. Because they create positive pressure, they need not be tightly fitted. PAPRs typically do not filter exhaust from the wearer.

Shortcomings 
The electrostatic filters in respirators are much easier to breathe through than cloth masks, however, when respirators are worn with additional coverings, such as surgical mask material, then they can make breathing harder for the wearer. As a result, exposure to carbon dioxide may exceed its OELs (0.5% by volume for 8-hour shift; 1.4% for 15 minutes exposure), with  levels inside reaching up to 2.6% for elastomeric respirators and up to 3.5 for FFRs. Mean values for several models; some models may provide a stronger exposure to carbon dioxide. These values are comparable to the  levels that normally occur within the trachea, and the volume inside a respirator facepiece is a fraction of the total volume inhaled with each breath, so the total  concentration for each breath is much less than the concentration within the small volume of the facepiece itself. Skin irritation and acne (from humidity and skin contact) can be an annoyance. The UK HSE textbook recommends limiting the use of respirators without air supply to 1 hour, while OSHA recommends respirator use for up to eight hours.

Almost all filtration methods perform poorly outside when environmental airborne water levels are high, causing saturation and clogging, increasing breathing resistance, and the collection of water on the electrostatic filter fibers can reduce the efficiency of the filter. Bidirectional air flow (as used on masks without an exhalation valve) compounds this problem further. Design standards are typically used for 'indoor' settings only.

Filtration standards

U.S. standards (N95 and others) 

In the United States, the National Institute for Occupational Safety and Health defines the following categories of particulate filters according to their NIOSH air filtration rating. (Categories highlighted in blue have not actually been applied to any products.)

Additionally, HE (high-efficiency) filters are the class of particulate filter used with powered air-purifying respirators.  These are 99.97% efficient against 0.3 micron particles, the same as a P100 filter.

During the COVID-19 pandemic, the US Occupational Safety and Health Administration issued an equivalency table, giving similar foreign standards for each US standard.

In the United States, N95 respirators are designed and/or made by companies such as 3M, Honeywell, Cardinal Health, Moldex, Kimberly-Clark, Alpha Pro Tech, Gerson, Prestige Ameritech and Halyard Health.  In Canada, N95s are made by AMD Medicom, Vitacore, Advanced Material Supply, Eternity and Mansfield Medical.  The Taiwanese company Makrite makes N95s as well as similar respirators for a number of other countries.  Degil is a label for some of Makrite's respirators.

European standards (FFP2 and others) 

European standard EN 143 defines the 'P' classes of particle filters that can be attached to a face mask, and European standard EN 149 defines the following classes of "filtering half masks" or "filtering facepieces" (FFP), that is respirators that are entirely or substantially constructed of filtering material:

The standards include testing mechanical strength, breathing resistance and clogging. EN 149 tests the inward leakage between the mask and face, where 10 human subjects perform 5 exercises each. The truncated mean of average leakage from 8 individuals must not exceed the aforementioned values.

In Germany, FFP2 respirators are made by companies such as Dräger, Uvex and Core Medical.  In Belgium, Ansell makes FFP2 masks.  In France, the company Valmy makes them.  In the United Kingdom, the company Hardshell has recently begun making FFP2 masks.

Other standards (KN95 and others) 

Respirator standards around the world loosely fall into the two camps of US- and EU-like grades. According to 3M, respirators made according to the following standards are equivalent to US N95 or European FFP2 respirators "for filtering non-oil-based particles such as those resulting from wildfires, PM 2.5 air pollution, volcanic eruptions, or bioaerosols (e.g. viruses)":

 Chinese KN95 (GB2626-2006): similar to US. Has category KN (non-oily particles) and KP (oily particles), 90/95/100 versions. EU-style leakage requirements. In China, KN95 respirators are made by companies such as Guangzhou Harley, Guangzhou Powecom, Shanghai Dasheng and FLTR.
 Korean 1st Class (KMOEL - 2017–64), also referred to as "KF94": EU grades, KF 80/94/99 for second/first/special. In Korea, KF94 respirators are made by companies such as LG, Soomlab, Airqueen, Kleannara, Dr. Puri, Bluna and BOTN.  The Hong Kong company Masklab also makes KF-style respirators.
 Australian/New Zealand P2 (AS/NZ 1716:2012): similar to EU grades.

The NPPTL has also published a guideline for using non-NIOSH masks instead of the N95 in the COVID-19 response. The OSHA has a similar document. The following respirator standards are considered similar to N95 in the US:

 Japanese DS2/RS2 (JMHLW-Notification 214, 2018): EU-like grades with two-letter prefix – first letter D/R stands for disposable or replaceable; second letter S/L stands for dry (NaCl) or oily (DOP oil) particles. Japanese DS2 respirators are made by companies such as Hogy Medical, Koken, Shigematsu, Toyo Safety, Trusco, Vilene and Yamamoto Safety.
 Mexican N95 (NOM-116-2009): same grades as in NIOSH.
 Brazilian PFF2 (ABNT/NBR 13698:2011): EU-like grades.

Disinfection and reuse

Hard filtering facepiece respirator masks are generally designed to be disposable, for 8 hours of continuous or intermittent use. One laboratory found that there was a decrease in fit quality after five consecutive donnings. Once they are physically too clogged to breathe through, they must be replaced.

Hard filtering facepiece respirator masks are sometimes reused, especially during pandemics, when there are shortages. Infectious particles could survive on the masks for up to 24 hours after the end of use, according to studies using models of SARS-CoV-2; In the COVID-19 pandemic, the US CDC recommended that if masks run short, each health care worker should be issued with five masks, one to be used per day, such that each mask spends at least five days stored in a paper bag between each use. If there are not enough masks to do this, they recommend sterilizing the masks between uses. Some hospitals have been stockpiling used masks as a precaution. The US CDC issued guidelines on stretching N95 supplies, recommending extended use over re-use. They highlighted the risk of infection from touching the contaminated outer surface of the mask, which even professionals frequently unintentionally do, and recommended washing hands every time before touching the mask. To reduce mask surface contamination, they recommended face shields, and asking patients to wear masks too ("source masking").

Apart from time, other methods of disinfection have been tested. Physical damage to the masks has been observed when microwaving them, microwaving them in a steam bag, letting them sit in moist heat, and hitting them with excessively high doses of ultraviolet germicidal irradiation (UVGI). Chlorine-based methods, such as chlorine bleach, may cause residual smell, offgassing of chlorine when the mask becomes moist, and in one study, physical breakdown of the nosepads, causing increased leakage. Fit and comfort do not seem to be harmed by UVGI, moist heat incubation, and microwave-generated steam.

Some methods may not visibly damage the mask, but they ruin the mask's ability to filter. The static electrical charge on the microfibers (which attracts or repels particles passing through the mask, making them more likely to move sideways and hit and stick to a fiber; see electret) is destroyed by some cleaning methods. UVGI (ultraviolet light), boiling water vapour, and dry oven heating do not seem to reduce the filter efficiency, and these methods successfully decontaminate masks.

UVGI (an ultraviolet method), ethylene oxide, dry oven heating and vaporized hydrogen peroxide are currently the most-favoured methods in use in hospitals, but none have been properly tested. Where enough masks are available, cycling them and reusing a mask only after letting it sit unused for five days is preferred.

It has been shown  that masks can also be sterilized by ionizing radiation. Gamma radiation and high energy electrons penetrate deeply into the material and can be used to sterilize large batches of masks within a short time period. The masks can be sterilized up to two times but have to be recharged after every sterilization as the surface charge is lost upon radiation.

A recent development is a composite fabric that can deactivate both biological and chemical threats

References 

Respirators
1956 introductions